Exposition, Eaux-Fortes et Méandres is the 8th album released by the French darkwave band Collection d'Arnell Andréa. The concept for the album is based on pianist Modest Mussorgsky's 1874 Pictures at an Exhibition piano suite, which in Mussorgsky created 10 different piano songs based on Russian artist Viktor Hartmann. The majority of the tracks on Exposition, Eaux-Fortes et Méandres are based on 19th-century paintings. These paintings had darker themes and included works from Arnold Böcklin's Isle of the Dead, Edward Robert Hughes, and John Everett Millais's Ophelia. The album cover art and title track, Les Méandres, are based on Richard Boutin's 1999 painting Crepuscule sur la Loire. Boutin also photographed the band for the album's liner notes.

Style
The songs feature vocals, guitar, keyboards, cello, and viola, but also synthesizers and electronic beats. The style has been compared to the Cocteau Twins and Dark Sanctuary.

Track listing

"Les Sombres Plis de l'âme" – 4:40
"The Monk on the Shore" – 6:18
"Les Herbes mortes" – 6:16
"Les Méandres" – 6:09
"The Long Shadow" – 4:53
"I Can't See Your Face" – 6:07
"Les Catacombes" – 4:00
"Into Flowers" – 5:33
"Crowns of Golden Corn" – 4:03
"L'Eau des mauves" – 5:14
"The Island of the Dead" – 5:07

Credits

Musicians
Chloé St Liphard : Voices
Carine Grieg : Keyboards
Thibault d'Aboville : Viola, Voices
Jean-Chrisophe d'Arnell : Keyboards, drums, Voices
Xavier Gaschignard : Cello
Vincent Magnien : Guitars
Franz Torres-Quevedo : Bass guitar, Voices

Graphic artists
Christophe Poly : liner notes
Vincent Lacape : liner notes, band photo
Richard Boutin : cover art, band photo

Production
Pierre-Emmanuel Meriaud (Studio Nyima) : engineering, mixing and programming
Terence (Studio Nyima) : mastering

References

External links
Album description on CDAA website

2007 albums
Dark wave albums
Collection d'Arnell-Andréa albums